Thomas Wilson Barnes (1825–1874) was an English chess master, one of the leading British masters of his time.

Chess history
Barnes was one of the leading British chess masters at the time of Paul Morphy's visit to the UK in 1858.  Barnes had the happy fortune of having the best record against Paul Morphy during the latter's visit, winning eight games and losing nineteen .  The only tournament he played in was London in 1862, where he finished in the middle of the field , .

Openings named for Barnes

A variation of the Ruy Lopez opening called the Barnes Defence was named after him: 1.e4 e5 2.Nf3 Nc6 3.Bb5 g6 (this is also sometimes known as the Smyslov Defence). A much more dubious variation named for him is Barnes Defence, 1.e4 f6 which he played against Anderssen and Morphy, beating the latter.  Barnes Opening, 1.f3, also bears his name. Opening with the f-pawn served his preference to sidestep existing opening knowledge.

Death
Barnes went on a diet and lost 130 pounds (9st 4 lb, approx. 59 kg) in 10 months, which resulted in his death. Barnes was buried 5 days after his death at the Brompton cemetery in London.

Notes

References

External links

1825 births
1874 deaths
British chess players
19th-century chess players